A national action plan is a nationwide initiative which sets out proposed work in a certain area, such as:

National Action Plan for Children, a child welfare plan in various countries
National Action Plan for Salinity and Water Quality in Australia, run by the National Heritage Trust
National Action Plan on Climate Change, an environmental action plan in China
National Action Plan on the Elimination of Child Labour, a child welfare plan in various countries
National Action Plan (Pakistan), a plan for combating terrorism
National Renewable Energy Action Plan, a framework set out by the European Commission for energy conservation

See also
Action plan
NAP (disambiguation)